Rocchetta Nervina is a comune (municipality) in the province of Imperia in the Italian region of Liguria.

Geography 

Rocchetta Nervina borders the following municipalities: Apricale, Breil-sur-Roya (France), Dolceacqua, Isolabona, Pigna and Saorge (France).

Demographic evolution

See also
 Parco naturale regionale delle Alpi Liguri
 Barbaira

References

External links
  Rocchetta Nervina official website

Cities and towns in Liguria